Aleksandar Ranđelović (or Aleksandar Randjelović, Serbian Cyrillic: Александар Ранђеловић, Chinese 雲迪奴域; born 9 December 1987) is a professional Serbian football attacking midfield who is currently a player of SC Ostbahn XI (Austria).

Born in Leskovac SR Serbia, he previously played for Vojvodina Novi Sad, Smederevo, Sloga Petrovac na Mlavi, Radnički Svilajnac, Orosháza, Békéscsaba, Lombard-Pápa TFC, Sun Pegasus and Pápa

References

Honours
Yuen Long
Hong Kong Senior Shield: 2017–18

External links 

Aleksandar Ranđelović at HKFA

1987 births
Living people
Serbian footballers
Association football midfielders
FK Vojvodina players
FK Smederevo players
FK Sloga Petrovac na Mlavi players
TSW Pegasus FC players
Yuen Long FC players
Hong Kong Premier League players
Expatriate footballers in Hong Kong